Yong tau foo (also spelled yong tao foo, yong tau fu, yong tau hu or yong tofu; ก๋วยเตี๋ยวแคะ in Thailand) is a Hakka Chinese dish consisting primarily of tofu filled with ground meat mixture or fish paste. Variation of this food include vegetables and mushrooms stuffed with ground meat or surimi. Yong tau foo is eaten in numerous ways, either dry with a sauce or served as a soup dish.

It is commonly found in parts of China, Indonesia, Malaysia, Singapore, Thailand, Vietnam, and in cities where there are large Hakka populations.

Variations

Fried
Traditional Hakka versions of yong tau foo consists of tofu cubes stuffed and heaped with minced meat (usually lamb or pork) and herbs, then fried until golden brown, or sometimes braised. Variations include usage of various condiments, including eggplants, shiitake mushrooms, and bitter melon stuffed with the same meat paste. Traditionally, yong tau foo is served in a clear yellow bean stew along with the bitter melon and shiitake variants.

Soup
Particularly in the Southeast Asian Hakka diaspora, the term "yong tau foo" is used to describe a soup dish that substitutes minced meat with fish paste (surimi). The base of the dish is various forms of tofu stuffed with fish paste, but it is now common to stuff vegetables like bitter melon, ladies fingers, chilis with fish paste as well, and the soup can include other ingredients like fish balls, crab sticks, cuttlefish, sausages, etc.  The foods are then sliced into bite-size pieces, cooked briefly in boiling broth and then served either in the broth as soup or with the broth in a separate bowl ("dry").  The dish is eaten with chopsticks and a soup spoon and can be eaten by itself or served with a bowl of steamed rice, noodles or rice vermicelli.  Another variation of this dish would be to serve it with laksa gravy or curry sauce. Essential accompaniments are a spicy, vinegary chili sauce, originally made with red fermented bean curd and distantly similar in taste to Sriracha sauce, and a distinctive brown sweet bean sauce or hoisin sauce for dipping.

Regional variations
In Malaysia, particularly the Klang Valley, yong tau foo is often associated with the city of Ampang, Selangor, just outside the eastern end of Kuala Lumpur.

Thai yentafo, while otherwise similar, has a distinct pink colored-broth due to the use of fermented bean paste, which may be supplemented by blood or food colouring.

In Vietnam, particularly in southern Vietnam, khổ qua cà ớt consists of fish paste (known as  chả cá) that is stuffed into either bitter melon, large chili peppers, fried tofu, eggplants, or tomatoes before being fried. The dish can be eaten as is, dipped in sauce, or in a bowl with broth.

Gallery

See also

 List of Chinese soups
 List of soups
 List of tofu dishes

References 

Chinese cuisine
Malaysian cuisine
Singaporean cuisine
Hakka cuisine
Tofu dishes
Hakka culture in Singapore